John of Hoo was an early fourteenth-century Abbot of Vale Royal Abbey, Cheshire. His abbacy was from around 1308–09 to 1314–15. 

 Hoo appears to have been something of a disciplinarian, even to point on occasion of expelling monks for the convent for their transgressions. He also continued his predecessor's feud with the Justice of Chester, Robert Holland, complaining that Holland repeatedly deprived the Abbey and its tenants of their forestry rights in Cheshire. Further, Hoo claimed, Holland also prevented him from exercising the Abbot's feudal jurisdiction over prisoners captured on the Abbey's own demesne lands. On the other hand, the Abbey's own chronicler described Hoo as a "good, gentle and simple" man. The financial problems of the Abbey—which had plagued its existence since its foundation—increased under Hoo's guardianship, and a few years into his office, in 1311, £200 was still owed to one of the custodians of the works from 1284.

John of Hoo is one of the earliest Abbots of Vale Royal known to have explicitly resigned his office. He is also the only one of those who did whose reasons are known: not only his old age and infirmity, but also "the ill will of the common people," to whom he had made himself so unpopular.

See also

 Dispute between Darnhall and Vale Royal Abbey

Notes

References

Bibliography
 
 
 
 
 

13th-century English people
Abbots of Vale Royal Abbey